The Groznensky okrug was a district (okrug) of the Terek Oblast of the Caucasus Viceroyalty of the Russian Empire. The area of the Groznensky okrug made up part of the North Caucasian Federal District of Russia. The district was eponymously named for its administrative centre, Grozny.

Administrative divisions 
The subcounties (uchastoks) of the Groznensky okrug were as follows:

Demographics

Russian Empire Census 
The majority of the population indicated Chechen to be their mother tongue, with a significant Russian speaking minority.

Kavkazskiy kalendar 

Notes

References

Bibliography 

Okrugs of Terek Oblast